George Krull (c.1921–1957) and Michael Krull (c.1925–1957) were brothers from McKees Rocks, Pennsylvania who were executed by the United States Federal Government on August 21, 1957. They were the only people ever executed in Georgia on a federal death warrant.

Early life 
The Krull brothers both had lengthy criminal records dating back to when they were youths.

Trial and execution 
On April 14, 1955, the Krull brothers kidnapped 53-year-old businesswoman Sunie Jones in Chattanooga, Tennessee. The two took her across state lines to Georgia, specifically Chickamauga and Chattanooga National Military Park. During the kidnapping, the Krull brothers beat Jones and raped her five times at knifepoint. She was beaten badly enough that she had to be hospitalized.

Because the Krull brothers had taken Jones over state lines from Tennessee to Georgia, the crime became a federal case under the Federal Kidnapping Act. The two also faced federal rape charges since Jones was raped in a national park. Although the victim did not die, the prosecution still sought death sentences for the Krull brothers, pointing to their lengthy criminal records and the brutality of the attack. At one point, they compared the brothers to hungry wolves.

The Krull brothers were found guilty and sentenced to life in prison for kidnapping and sentenced to death for rape. They also received five-year sentences for transporting a stolen vehicle across state lines. Another man, Edward Bice, received a five-year sentence for being an accessory after the fact for impeding the investigation.

After President Dwight D. Eisenhower declined to commute their death sentences, the Krull brothers were executed in Georgia's electric chair. George was 34 years old at the time of his death and Michael was 32.

Michael Krull commented on the death sentence, "It was all prejudice. When your local people commit rape they get just 10 or 20 years sometimes."

See also
 Capital punishment by the United States federal government
 List of people executed by the United States federal government

References

1920s births
1957 deaths
20th-century executions of American people
20th-century executions by the United States federal government
Brothers
Criminal duos
Executed people from Pennsylvania
Fugitives
People executed by the United States federal government by electric chair
Year of birth uncertain
People convicted under the Federal Kidnapping Act
People executed for rape